James Boyd Greenspoon (February 7, 1948 – March 11, 2015) was an American keyboard player and composer, best known as a member of the band Three Dog Night.

Early life and education 
Greenspoon was born in Los Angeles, California, and raised in Beverly Hills.  His musical training began at the age of seven with classical piano lessons encouraged by his mother, Mary O'Brian.  O'Brian was a silent screen actress, who had film roles including the wife in Buster Keaton's 1926 movie Battling Butler.  Greenspoon attended Beverly Hills High School along with Richard Dreyfuss, Bonnie Franklin and his childhood friend producer, Michael Lloyd. Lloyd and Greenspoon had their first chart success with the surf group The New Dimensions, in 1963.  Greenspoon attended the Los Angeles Conservatory of Music and studied with west coast piano instructor, Harry Fields. Greenspoon had one daughter, Heather Greenspoon.

Career 
Greenspoon performed and recorded with Linda Ronstadt, Eric Clapton, Jimi Hendrix, America, The Beach Boys, Beck, Bogert & Appice, Nils Lofgren, Lowell George, Kim Fowley, Donovan, Buddy Miles, Stephen Stills, Jeff Beck, Chris Hillman, Steve Cropper, Duck Dunn, James Burton, Hal Blaine, Leon Russell, The Wrecking Crew, Osibisa, Shaun Cassidy, Cheech & Chong, and Redbone.

Greenspoon worked on the Sunset Strip in the 1960s with the groups Sound of the Seventh Son and The East Side Kids. His bands held residence at The Trip, Stratford on Sunset (now The House Of Blues) Brave New World, Bidos Litos, Ciros, and The Whiskey.

In late 1966, Greenspoon moved to Denver, Colorado, with the members of The West Coast Pop Art Experimental Band and formed the group Superband. In 1968, Greenspoon moved back to Los Angeles, where he met Danny Hutton, and subsequently formed Three Dog Night.

Other ventures
Greenspoon served as an Entertainment and Media Consultant with the Murry-Wood Foundation and composed original music for the movies Fragment, produced by Lloyd Levin, United 93, Hellboy, Watchmen, Field of Dreams, Predator, and Die Hard. He collaborated with the composer Neil Argo.

Recognition 
In 2000, a Golden Palm Star on the Palm Springs, California, Walk of Stars was dedicated to him.

Illness and death 
In 2014, Greenspoon was diagnosed with metastatic melanoma, and stopped touring with Three Dog Night. He died of cancer on March 11, 2015, in North Potomac, Maryland, at the age of 67.

Bibliography

References

External links

1948 births
2015 deaths
21st-century American keyboardists
Musicians from Los Angeles
American rock keyboardists
American memoirists
Beverly Hills High School alumni
Three Dog Night members
Deaths from cancer in Maryland
20th-century American keyboardists